Techno Global University Madhya Pradesh is a private university in India established by the Techno Global University Act, 2013. 
 
The university offers undergraduate and post graduate courses including M.Phil and Ph.D programmes in arts, humanities, science, social Sciences, commerce, education, engineering, management, computer applications, pharmacy, allied health sciences, journalism  and mass communications, library and information sciences, architecture and town planning, hotel management and catering technology, nursing, agriculture and dairy technology, law and other subjects.

References

Universities in Madhya Pradesh
Educational institutions established in 2013
Private universities in India
Education in Madhya Pradesh
2013 establishments in Madhya Pradesh